Wharncliffe may refer to:

People
Baron Wharncliffe (disambiguation), various holders of a title of the English peerage created in 1826
Earl of Wharncliffe, a title of the English peerage created in 1876

Places
Canada
Wharncliffe and Kynoch, a local services board in Ontario province 
Wharncliffe Range, a small mountain range in British Columbia

United Kingdom
Wharncliffe Crags, a gritstone escarpment near Sheffield in South Yorkshire, England
Wharncliffe Side, a village in South Yorkshire

USA
Wharncliffe, West Virginia, an unincorporated community in Mingo County

Other
Wharncliffe Charity Cup, a football competition named for the 1st Earl of Wharncliffe
Wharncliffe Viaduct, a railway viaduct in Ealing, London, named for the 1st Earl of Wharncliffe
Wharncliffe War Hospital was located during World War I at Middlewood Hospital, Sheffield
Wharncliffe Woodmoor 1, 2 & 3 Colliery, a coal mine near Barnsley, South Yorkshire
A shape of knife blade

See also

Warden Clip